Michurinskoye is a settlement on Karelian Isthmus, in Priozersky District of Leningrad Oblast. Before the Winter War and Continuation War it was the administrative center of the Valkjärvi municipality of Finland.

Rural localities in Leningrad Oblast
Karelian Isthmus